The Music of Nashville: Season 4, Volume 2 is the eighth original soundtrack from the American musical drama television series Nashville, created by Academy Award winner Callie Khouri and starring Connie Britton as country music superstar Rayna Jaymes and Hayden Panettiere as Juliette Barnes. The album was released digitally on May 13, 2016, and on compact disc exclusively through Target in North America. The album reached number 2 on the UK country charts. This album also marks the final release with the show's association with ABC/Disney, as the show moved to CMT for its 5th season.

Track listing

References

Television soundtracks
2016 soundtrack albums
Big Machine Records soundtracks
Country music soundtracks
Music of Nashville: Season 4, Volume 2